The Cambodia records in swimming are the fastest ever performances of swimmers from Cambodia, which are recognised and ratified by the Khmer Amateur Swimming Federation.

All records were set in finals unless noted otherwise.

Long Course (50 m)

Men

Women

Short Course (25 m)

Men

Women

References
General
Cambodia Long Course records – Men 01.01.2015 Updated
Cambodia Short Course records – Men 01.01.2015 Updated
Specific

Cambodia
Records
Swimming